Cocoa palm could refer to:
Cocus nucifera, the coconut palm; historically referred to as the cocao-nut palm
Theobroma cacao, the cocoa tree; the source of cocoa but not a palm